Peter Javier Vera Díaz (born December 8, 1982 in Montevideo, Uruguay) is a Uruguayan football player who currently plays as a midfielder and is free agent.

International career
Vera has played for the Uruguay under-17 team at the 1999 FIFA U-17 World Championship.

External links
  Peter Vera Zanziball.it profile
 Profile at soccerway
 Profile at ceroacero.es
 Stats at footballdatabase.eu

1982 births
Living people
Uruguayan footballers
Club Nacional de Football players
C.A. Bella Vista players
Rampla Juniors players
Shanghai Shenhua F.C. players
Chinese Super League players
Club Atlético River Plate (Montevideo) players
Foolad FC players
Expatriate footballers in Iran
Expatriate footballers in China
Uruguayan expatriate sportspeople in China
Expatriate footballers in Chile
C.D. Arturo Fernández Vial footballers
San Luis de Quillota footballers
Primera B de Chile players

Association football midfielders
Uruguayan expatriate footballers